Kamalpur is a town in Kamrup district, Assam. It is 32 km from Jalukbari, Guwahati and surrounded by Rangia town, Baihata Chariali and Kaniha, Dimu Dobak villages. It is also a constituency of the Assam Legislative Assembly.

Educational institutes
 Kamalpur Higher Secondary School, Kamalpur
 Kamalpur MV School, Kamalpur
 Kamalpur College, Kamalpur
 Kamalpur High Madrasa School, Kamalpur
Sankar Ajan Shiksha Niketan, Kamalpur

Government Medicals
 Kamalpur PHC, kamalpur
 Mahatma Gandhi Kamalpur Model Hospital 
 Kamalpur State veterinary Dispensary, kamalpur

Government offices
 CIRCLE Office, kamalpur Circle
 Kamalpur Police Station, kamalpur
 Baihata Post Office, Kamalpur
 Block Development Office, Kamalpur
 Baihata Railway Station
 Block Elementary Education Office, Kamalpur
 Office of the Asstt Executive Engineer, PWD
 Office of the Asstt Executive Engineer, PHE
 Kamalpur Telephone Exchange

Transport
Kamalpur is accessible through National Highway 31.

Its 41 km from Lokapriya Gopinath Bordoloi International Airport, Guwahati.
Nearest Railway Station is Baihata for local trains and Rangia Railway Junction for mail/Express trains.

See also
 Nalbari
 Baihata Chariali

References

Cities and towns in Kamrup district